Harun Alpsoy (born 3 March 1997) is a Turkish footballer who plays for Schaffhausen.

International career
Alpsoy was born in Switzerland and is of Turkish descent. Originally a youth international for Switzerland, Alpsoy switched to represent Turkey. He made his international debut for the Turkey U20s in a 2-1 2018 Toulon Tournament win over the Japan U20s on 28 May 2018.

References

External links

Sky Sports Profile

Switzerland U15 Profile
Switzerland U16 Profile
Switzerland U17 Profile
Swtizerland U18 Profile
Switzerland U19 Profile

1997 births
People from Kulm District
Swiss people of Turkish descent
Sportspeople from Aargau
Living people
Turkish footballers
Turkey youth international footballers
Swiss men's footballers
Switzerland youth international footballers
Association football midfielders
Grasshopper Club Zürich players
Antalyaspor footballers
Altay S.K. footballers
FC Schaffhausen players
Swiss 1. Liga (football) players
Swiss Super League players
Süper Lig players
TFF First League players